Crabtree is a hamlet in the parish of Lower Beeding and in Horsham District of West Sussex, England. It lies on the A281 road 4.4 miles (7.1 km) southeast of Horsham.

External links

The Crabtree, Public House

Horsham District
Villages in West Sussex